Kaarimba (also unofficially known as Karimba) is a locality in Victoria, Australia in the local government area of the Shire of Moira.

The Goulburn River borders the south-west of the locality. Karimba Post Office, spelt with one 'A', opened on the 15 January 1877 and was closed on the 21 June 1946.

References

Towns in Victoria (Australia)
Shire of Moira